Ma and Pa Kettle are comic film characters of the successful film series of the same name, produced by Universal Studios, in the late 1940s and 1950s. “The hillbilly duo have their hands full with a ramshackle farm and a brood of rambunctious children. When the future comes a-callin' in the form of modern houses, exotic locales, and newfangled ideas, Ma and Pa must learn how to make the best of it with luck, pluck, and a little country charm.”

Originally based on real-life farming neighbors in Washington, United States, Ma and Pa Kettle were created by Betty MacDonald in whose 1945 best-selling novel, The Egg and I, they appeared. The success of the novel spawned the 1947 film The Egg and I starring Claudette Colbert and Fred MacMurray, also co-starring Marjorie Main and Percy Kilbride as Ma and Pa Kettle. Main was nominated for an Academy Award for Best Supporting Actress for her role.

After the audiences' positive reaction to the Kettles in the film, Universal Studios produced nine more films, with Marjorie Main reprising her role in all and Percy Kilbride reprising his in seven. The films grossed an estimated $35 million altogether at the box office and are said to have saved Universal from bankruptcy.

Premise
Phoebe "Ma" Kettle (played by Marjorie Main in all 10 films) is a raucous, hardworking country woman with a robust figure. She is more ambitious and smarter than Pa, but not by much, and can easily be fooled. (In the book, she is earthier and more profane. When she was a newly emigrated Baltic teenager, she married Pa under the impression that since he owned a farm, he was a solid prospect.) Ma is content with her role as mother to 15 rambunctious, mischievous children on their ramshackle farm in rural Cape Flattery, Washington. Because she has so many children, Ma sometimes gets their names confused. A misspelled sign "Be-ware of childrun" is posted in front of the farmhouse to warn unwanted visitors of hurled rocks, projectiles from slingshots and pea shooters, and other missiles launched by the rowdy and unpredictable Kettle brood.
Franklin "Pa" Kettle (played by Percy Kilbride in the first eight films and by Parker Fennelly in the 10th and last film) is a gentle, slow-speaking, slow-thinking, and lazy man. His only talents appear to be avoiding work and winning contests. In the second film of the series, the family moves into a modern home with numerous electronic gadgets that Pa has won in a tobacco slogan-writing contest. As the series continued, various reasons were devised to have the family relocate to the "old place", sometimes for extended periods of time. Much of the comedy is cornball humor arising from preposterous situations, such as Pa masquerading as a wealthy industrialist ("P.A. Kettle" in Ma and Pa Kettle at Waikiki, 1955) or being jailed after he accidentally causes racehorses to eat feed laced with concrete (Ma and Pa Kettle at the Fair, 1952). He has a younger brother, Sedgewick Kettle (played by Arthur Hunnicutt in the ninth film), who owns their parents' farm in Mournful Hollow, Arkansas.

Recurring characters in the series
Thomas "Tom" Kettle is the eldest of the Kettle children and is portrayed by Richard Long in the first four films. Tom works hard and goes to college at Washington State University, studying animal husbandry. He designs an improved chicken incubator. He meets his future wife, Kim, in a train ride back to Cape Flattery, but due to work issues, the two relocate to New York City.
Kimberly "Kim" Kettle (née Parker) is the wife of Tom Kettle and is portrayed by Meg Randall in three films. She was the reporter for a popular Seattle magazine and came to Cape Flattery to write a series of articles on the Kettles and their new model home. Kim is very fond of the Kettles.
Birdie Hicks is the Kettles' aging, cantankerous archenemy and is portrayed by Esther Dale in four films. She usually rides around in either her Model T car or her horse-drawn buggy with her elderly mother, lamenting Pa's laziness and the family's lack of organization. Birdie frequently competes with Ma whenever there is a quilt or jam contest at the county fair. In a rare act of kindness, she gives Ma and Pa the prize money she won at a horse race so Rosie can go to college. Apparently, her mother, Mrs. Hicks or Mother Hicks (played by Isabel O'Madigan in two films and by Hallene Hill in one), sympathizes with the Kettles.
Billy Reed is the town's efficacious salesman portrayed by Billy House in the first film (1947), and then by Emory Parnell in four films (1949–1954). Billy has a store in downtown Cape Flattery where his motto is written: "If there's anything you need, just come in and see Billy Reed." He often stops at the Kettle place to sell or to pay a visit to them.
Rosie Kettle is the Kettles' second-eldest daughter portrayed by Gloria Moore in one and Lori Nelson in two films. She desires to go to Sheraton College, but is unable to do so because of the family's economic instability. She is later learned to be working in Seattle. Rosie travels to Waikiki with Ma and Pa to help with cousin Rodney's pineapple enterprise.
Jonathan and Elizabeth Parker are Kim Kettle's parents portrayed by Ray Collins and Barbara Brown in two films. They travel from Boston to see Tom and Kim's newborn baby in the fourth film. Elizabeth does not get along with the Kettles at first, but over time, realizes her mistake; Jonathan enjoys being with them from the start. The Parkers invite Ma and Pa to a trip to Paris in the sixth film.
Geoduck and Crowbar (Oliver Blake and Teddy Hart, respectively) are Pa's Native American friends and usually act as his handymen, doing various tasks around the house under Pa's "supervision." Geoduck is the chief of their tribe.

Kettle Kids
Ma and Pa Kettle and Ma and Pa Kettle Go to Town mention 15 kids (including Thomas and Rosie above), although inconsistency arises in the names

Animals on the Kettles' farm

Bossie is the Kettles' red and white milk cow, which provides Ma, Pa, and their family of with plenty of milk. Most of the time, the older Kettle boys or even Pa's Indian friends, Geoduck and Crowbar, milk her. In "Ma and Pa Kettle Go to Town" (1950), Pa is seen milking Bossie while listening to the music playing on the radio.

The chickens are a flock of nearly 100 chickens kept by the Kettles on their broken-down farm, which provide them with many eggs each day. Sometimes, one or two of the hens cause mischief towards the Kettles or other characters in the films. In Ma and Pa Kettle at Home (1954), Ma Kettle's prized speckled hen is seen a few times laying eggs on Mannering's head or in his bowler hat.

Pa Kettle's team includes an old, retired trotting horse, named Emma, and a white donkey wearing a straw hat, which together pull Pa's wagon around the county. In Ma and Pa Kettle at the Fair (1952), Pa buys Emma originally to win a horse race at the county fair.

Nick is the Kettles' prized black bull. He spends most of his time living on the Kettles' farm, which is his main home, but in Ma and Pa Kettle at Home, he sneaks out of the farm and lumbers towards the Maddocks' farm to visit one of John Maddocks' prize cows, Bessie. He is often seen wearing a derby hat on his head, similar to the same type of hat that Pa Kettle wears.

The goats are herd of four white Saanen goats that live on the Kettles' farm. In Ma and Pa Kettle at Home, their original owner, John Maddocks, sells them to Pa Kettle for $100. The goats spend most of their time grazing around the farm, but the largest of them, a large buck with massive, curved horns, often causes everyone trouble. In Ma and Pa Kettle at Home, he butts Ma, then Mannering, and lastly Pa, after they turn their backs to him. In Ma and Pa Kettle Back on the Farm, he starts chewing on several sticks of dynamite that Pa bought to make a new well for Ma, but Pa keeps snatching them from him.

Agnes is the Kettles' family Bluetick Coonhound, which also lives on the farm. She is often seen wearing a sweater that Ma Kettle made for her. In Ma and Pa Kettle at Home, she produces a litter of puppies for the Kettles and their friends at their Christmas Eve party.

Kettle farm set

The Kettle Farm (also known as Gausman Ranch) was a movie ranch in Universal Studios, where most of the Ma and Pa Kettle features were filmed. The set was redressed several times to resemble a cluttered farmhouse with dilapidating farm buildings. The Kettles' farmhouse did not appear in Ma and Pa Kettle on Vacation and Ma and Pa Kettle at Waikiki. The farm buildings were restored and painted for Ma and Pa Kettle at Home. The entire farm set was modified for The Kettles in the Ozarks, where it was reused as Uncle Sedge's farm in Arkansas. The remodeled farmhouse was also used for The Kettles on Old MacDonald's Farm. Prior to the Kettle Farm area being demolished in 1969 to begin construction on the Gibson Amphitheatre, it was significantly altered for the filming of Spartacus. Today, this site is The Wizarding World of Harry Potter.

The movie ranch appeared in other films and television series, including:

 The Thing That Couldn't Die (1958)
 The Deputy (1959–1961)
 Alfred Hitchcock Presents (9th season episode "The Jar")
 Adam-12 (1968–1975)

Films

The ten Kettle films are:
The Egg and I (1947)
Ma and Pa Kettle (1949) or The Further Adventures of Ma and Pa Kettle
Ma and Pa Kettle Go to Town (1950)
Ma and Pa Kettle Back on the Farm (1951)
Ma and Pa Kettle at the Fair (1952)
Ma and Pa Kettle on Vacation (1953)
Ma and Pa Kettle at Home (1954)
Ma and Pa Kettle at Waikiki (1955)
The Kettles in the Ozarks (1956)
The Kettles on Old MacDonald's Farm (1957)

The Egg and I
Ma and Pa Kettle first appeared in supporting roles as neighbors in The Egg and I, starring Fred MacMurray and Claudette Colbert as a refined city couple who move to a rural chicken farm. Marjorie Main, a veteran character actress, played a hardy country woman in dozens of films, so was a natural for the role of Ma Kettle.  Main was nominated for the Academy Award for Best Supporting Actress.

Ma and Pa Kettle series
After the success of The Egg and I, Percy Kilbride and she starred in their own series of Ma and Pa Kettle movies, which became box-office bonanzas for Universal Pictures, having earned an estimated $35 million for the entire series.

Kilbride retired after making Ma and Pa Kettle at Home (although Waikiki was released last), primarily from boredom with the character, as well as health concerns.

The Kettles films
The Pa Kettle character did not appear at all in The Kettles in the Ozarks, in which Arthur Hunnicutt played Pa's brother Sedgewick Kettle. In The Kettles on Old MacDonald's Farm, the last Kettle movie, Parker Fennelly played Pa Kettle.

Box office rankings
At the height of the popularity of the series, exhibitors polled by Quigley Publishing voted Kilbride and Main among the most popular stars in the US:
1951 - Marjorie Main alone 15th-most popular star
1952 - Main and Kilbride 25th-most popular
1953 - Main and Kilbride 13th-most popular
1954 - Main and Kilbride 15th-most popular
1955 - Main and Kilbride 25th-most popular

Adaptations and revivals

Betty MacDonald's characters Ma and Pa Kettle also appeared in television's first comedy serial, The Egg and I, which aired on CBS (September 3, 1951 – August 1, 1952). Each episode was only 15 minutes long. Ma Kettle was played by Doris Rich and Pa Kettle was played by Frank Twedell. Betty Lynn (better known as Barney Fife's girlfriend Thelma Lou from The Andy Griffith Show) played Betty MacDonald in some episodes, including "Pa Turns Over a New Leaf" (which aired on May 21, 1952).  The role was usually played by Pat Kirkland. Another episode, "The Purloined Jacket", starred Mary Perry as Cammy, Richard Carlyle as Joe Kettle, and William A. Lee as Ed Peabody.

Animator Walter Lantz produced a short-lived cartoon series for Universal Pictures called "Maw and Paw", although only four cartoons were released between 1953 and 1955.  The characters Maw and Paw (voiced by Grace Stafford and Dal McKennon, respectively) were based on the characters of Ma and Pa Kettle. The spellings of Maw and Paw Kettle appeared in the book The Egg and I (1945).  Another Walter Lantz cartoon, "The Ostrich Egg And I" (1956), from the Maggie & Sam series, was a spoof of The Egg and I, with Maggie voiced by Grace Stafford and Sam voiced by Daws Butler.

In The Munsters season-one episode "Family Portrait" (S01 E13, 1964-12-17), a magazine writer makes a reference to the Kettles when he sees the Munster home, which he implies resembles the Kettle farmhouse: "Let's see if Ma and Pa Kettle are home."

In several Warners Bros. cartoons of the 1950s and 1960s, prolific voice artist June Foray imitates Marjorie Main's voice whenever a big, aggressive female character appears in the cartoon.  Many boomer kids became familiar with Foray's version of Main's voice before they discovered Marjorie Main as the source of Foray's imitation.

The satirical film Loose Shoes (1980), which starred Bill Murray, included a sketch called "A Visit With Ma and Pa", where Ma Kettle was played by Ysabel MacCloskey and Pa Kettle was played by Walker Edmiston.

DVD releases
The Adventures of Ma and Pa Kettle Volume 1 

as the first part of Universal's Franchise Collection series.
The Egg and I
Ma and Pa Kettle
Ma and Pa Kettle Go to Town
Ma and Pa Kettle Back on the Farm

The Adventures of Ma and Pa Kettle Volume 2 

as the second part of Universal's Franchise Collection series.
Ma and Pa Kettle at the Fair
Ma and Pa Kettle on Vacation
Ma and Pa Kettle at Home
Ma and Pa Kettle at Waikiki

The Further Adventures of the Kettles 

as a TCM Vault Collection presented by Universal Studios: 
The Kettles in the Ozarks
The Kettles in Old MacDonald's Farm

The Ma and Pa Kettle Complete Comedy Collection

as a TCM Vault Collection presented by Universal Studios: 
The Egg and I
Ma and Pa Kettle
Ma and Pa Kettle Go to Town
Ma and Pa Kettle Back on the Farm
Ma and Pa Kettle at the Fair
Ma and Pa Kettle on Vacation
Ma and Pa Kettle at Home
Ma and Pa Kettle at Waikiki
The Kettles in the Ozarks
The Kettles in Old MacDonald's Farm

References

External links
 

 
Fictional characters from Washington (state)
Fictional married couples
Film series introduced in 1947
Films about farmers
Literary characters introduced in 1945
American film series